WHCE is a non-commercial Contemporary Hit Radio formatted broadcast radio station.  The station is licensed to Highland Springs, Virginia and Metro Richmond in Virginia.  WHCE is owned by Henrico County Public Schools and operated under their Henrico County Schools.

On-air operations are handled by the students at the Advance Career Education Center at Highland Springs, which was previously called the Highland Springs Technical Center.

References

External links
 Mix91fm Online
 

1980 establishments in Virginia
Contemporary hit radio stations in the United States
Radio stations established in 1980
HCE
Education in Henrico County, Virginia